Jean Cussac (born 31 May 1922) is a French baritone and music director.

Biography 
Born in Paris, Jean Cussac studied lyrical singing at the Conservatoire de Paris, and subsequently turned to jazz and joined The Swingle Singers at their creation in 1962, alongside , Jeanette Beaucomont, Christiane Legrand, Claude and José Germain. Together, they recorded many albums and received several awards including the Grammy Award for Best New Artist in 1964 and the Grand Prix du disque of the Académie Charles-Cros.

Also in 1964 he was chosen to be the singing voice of the prince during the redubbing of Snow White and the Seven Dwarfs. After this he worked regularly with Walt Disney Pictures as a singer. His contributions included One Hundred and One Dalmatians, The Sword in the Stone, Mary Poppins, The Jungle Book and Pinocchio. He also worked as musical director on Dumbo, The Fox and the Hound, The Great Mouse Detective, Lady and the Tramp, which provided an opportunity for him to continue working with his Swingle partners.

As music director he supervised The Secret of NIMH (1982), Annie and An American Tail (1986) and others.

He was also Kapellmeister at Les Invalides church in Paris.

Cussac celebrated his 100th birthday in 2022 in a retirement home in Gujan-Mestras.

References

External links
 Portrait in La Gazette du doublage (archived)
 

1922 births
Living people
Musicians from Paris
20th-century French male singers
French choral conductors
French male conductors (music)
French operatic baritones
Conservatoire de Paris alumni
20th-century French conductors (music)
21st-century French conductors (music)
The Swingle Singers members
French centenarians
Men centenarians